

Billy Bigley Jr. (born June 9, 1962) is an American racing driver who resides in Naples, Florida and competed in the NASCAR Craftsman Truck Series.

Bigley competed in the entire 2001 NASCAR Craftsman Truck Series schedule for Spears Motorsports. He finished 13th in points with a best finish of fifth at Kansas Speedway. He also made two ARCA starts that year for Spears Motorsports, winning his debut at the Memphis Motorsports Park and finishing seventh at Kentucky Speedway.

He later competed in the USARacing Pro Cup Series Southern Division.

Motorsports career results

NASCAR
(key) (Bold – Pole position awarded by qualifying time. Italics – Pole position earned by points standings or practice time. * – Most laps led.)

Winston Cup Series

Busch Series

Craftsman Truck Series

ARCA Re/Max Series
(key) (Bold – Pole position awarded by qualifying time. Italics – Pole position earned by points standings or practice time. * – Most laps led.)

References

External links
 

1962 births
NASCAR drivers
ARCA Menards Series drivers
CARS Tour drivers
American Speed Association drivers
Sportspeople from Naples, Florida
Living people
Racing drivers from Florida